Interstate 194 is the designation for two Interstate Highways in the United States, both of which are related to Interstate 94:
Interstate 194 (Michigan), a spur to Battle Creek
Interstate 194 (North Dakota), an unsigned spur to Bismarck

94-1
1